Spencer Adams Pease (February 24, 1817 – December 19, 1889) was an American physician, newspaper editor, lawyer, and politician.

Born in Spafford, Onondaga County, New York, Pease was educated in Auburn, New York. In 1837, Pease settled in Salem, Wisconsin Territory and practiced law. Pease then studied medicine at Rush Medical College and practiced medicine. In 1850, Pease settled in Packwaukee, Marquette County, Wisconsin. In 1862, Pease moved to Montello, Wisconsin. He became the editor and publisher that eventually became the Montello Weekly Express. Pease also served as Marquette County treasurer in 1857 and 1858 In 1865, 1866, 1870, and 1871, Pease served in the Wisconsin State Assembly and was a Democrat. Pease died in Montello, Wisconsin.

Notes

1817 births
1889 deaths
People from Onondaga County, New York
People from Marquette County, Wisconsin
Rush Medical College alumni
Editors of Wisconsin newspapers
Physicians from Wisconsin
Wisconsin lawyers
County officials in Wisconsin
Democratic Party members of the Wisconsin State Assembly
19th-century American politicians
Journalists from New York (state)
People from Montello, Wisconsin
19th-century American lawyers